The Army Cadet Force (ACF) is a cadet organisation based in the United Kingdom. It is a voluntary youth group sponsored by the Ministry of Defence (British Army). The ACF is largely composed of individual units. These units are organised into several different companies/squadrons, which in turn are organised into several different Corps or Regiments of their parent British Army units.

Organisation
Most British counties have centralised cadet forces that make up the Army Cadet Force as a national whole. The counties are generally split into companies, each of which includes several 'detachments', the name given to a unit of cadets that parade in a particular town or village. Battalions are usually affiliated with a certain Regiment or Corps within the British Army, and wear their insignia including cap badge, the colour of beret and stable belt subject to individual County/Area regulations. Detachments can be given special names after famous battles fought by the British Army, e.g. Rhine, Gibraltar and Waterloo. But some detachments are just called by the name of the town they reside in.

England

North East ACF Region
North East England Region comprises the areas of County Durham Northumberland, Tyne and Wear, North Yorkshire, East Yorkshire, South Yorkshire, and West Yorkshire.  All cadet forces are known collectively as 'North East ACF Regiment'.

 Cleveland ACF (comprising the former non-metropolitan county of Cleveland, also serving North Yorkshire (North) and County Durham (South East), county affiliated to Yorkshire Regiment.
 A Company, HQ in Norton — Detachments in Billingham, Hardwick, Hartburn, Hartlepool (2 detachments), High Tunstall, Norton (2 detachments), and Yarm.
 B Company, HQ in Coulby Newham — Detachments in St Peter's School, Brambles Farm, Burlam Road (Middlesbrough), Coulby Newham, Ingleby Barwick, Thornaby-on-Tees, and Parkwood (Middlesbrough)
 C Company, HQ in Loftus — Detachments in Freebrough, Guisborough, Loftus, Normanby, Redcar, Redcar Academy, and Saltburn-by-the-Sea
Durham ACF (comprising County Durham (minus those parts in the former county of Cleveland, those detachments under Cleveland ACF, also Tyne and Wear (South))  Durham ACF maintains a Band & Bugles in Chester-le-Street
A Company, HQ in South Shields — Detachments in Seaburn, Northfield Gardens, Jarrow, Hebburn, Gateshead, and Blaydon
B Company, HQ in Washington — Detachments in Consett, Annfield Plain, Stanley, Chester-le-Street, Birtley, Sulgrave, and Sunderland South
C Company, HQ in Gilesgate — Detachments in Durham, Ushaw Moor, Houghton-le-Spring, Seaham, Horden, and Ryhope
D Company, HQ in Bishop Auckland — Detachments in Darlington (2 detachments), Newton Aycliffe, Spennymoor, Willington, Bishop Auckland, and Barnard Castle
Northumbria ACF (comprising Northumberland and Tyne and Wear (North)
Detachments in Alnwick, Amble, Bedlington, Bellingham, Berwick-upon-Tweed, Broomhill, Cassino Band of Northumbria Army Cadet Force in Newcastle upon Tyne, Cowpen (Blyth), Cramlington, Excelsior Academy, Fenham Barracks, Fenham, Gosforth, Guide Post, Heaton, Hexham, Kingston Park (Tyneside Scottish Detachment), Monkseaton, Morpeth, Newbiggin-by-the-Sea, Ponteland, Prudhoe, Rothbury, Seaton Burn, Slatyford, Tynemouth, and Walker on Tyne.

North West ACF Region
Cheshire ACF has its HQ at Fox Barracks, Chester.
Notable former cadets include philanthropist Joshua Kinsella
It has detachments in Alsager, Birchwood, Chester (Abbots Park, The Castle), Congleton, Crewe, Ellesmere Port, Frodsham, Great Sankey, Knutsford, Little Neston, Macclesfield, Nantwich, Northwich, Runcorn (Halton), Sandbach, Stockton Heath, Tarporley, Warrington, Weaverham, Widnes, Wilmslow, Winsford.

Cumbria ACF has three companies: Arnhem company (North Cumbria) with detachments in Brampton, Currock, Caldew School, Wigton, Longtown, Penrith, Harraby, Eden Grove School, and Carlisle Castle; Burma company (South Cumbria) with detachments in Barrow, Ulverston, Walney Island, Windermere, Millom, Kendal and Dalton; and Chindit company (West Cumbria) with detachments in Aspatria, Workington, Maryport, Keswick, Cockermouth, Cleator Moor, Whitehaven.

Greater Manchester ACF has detachments in Altrincham, Ashton-under-Lyne, Audenshaw, Bolton, Bredbury, Broughton, Bury, Chadderton, Cheadle Hulme, Crumpsall, Failsworth, Heywood, Hindley, Hulme, Hyde, Kearsley, Leigh, Manchester (Ardwick, Clifton, Flixton, Gorton, Levenshulme, Patricroft, Rusholme, Stretford, Tyldesley), Middleton, Oldham, Radcliffe, Rochdale, Sale, Salford, Shaw and Crompton, Stalybridge, Stockport, (Greek Street, Pear Hill, Reddish Road) and Wigan

The Isle of Man ACF has detachments in Castletown, Douglas, Peel and Ramsey.

Lancashire ACF has its HQ at Fullwood Barracks, Preston.

It has detachments in:

N (Normandy) Company
 Galgate
 Garstang
 Morecambe
 Heysham
 Lancaster (Lancaster and Lunesdale Detachments)
 Carnforth.
S (Salerno) Company
 Dunkirk (Leyland) Detachment
 Preston Detachment
 Preston (Corps of Drums) Detachment
 Fulwood Detachment
 Chorley Detachment
 Lostock Hall Detachment
 Longridge Detachment
 Skelmersdale Detachment
 Ormskirk Detachment
 Leyland Detachment.

E (Egypt) Company
 Accrington. (Accrington Detachment, Cap badged to Duke of Lancaster's Regt)
 Burnley (Kimberley and Waterloo Detachment, Cap badged to Duke of Lancaster's Regt) Detachments
 Barnoldswick. Barnoldswick Detachment, Cap badged to Duke of Lancaster's Regt 
 Brierfield. Brierfield 
Detachment, Cap badged to Duke of Lancaster's Regt   
 Blackburn. Blackburn Royal Signals Detachment, Detachment, Cap badged to Royal Signals 
 Blackburn. Blackburn Quebec & Somme Detachment, Cap badged to Duke of Lancaster's Regt
 Clitheroe. Clitheroe Detachment, Cap badged to Duke of Lancaster's Regt
 Haslingden. Haslingden Detachment, Cap badged to Duke of Lancaster's Regt

W (Wingate) Company
 Blackpool (Palatine and Blackpool) Detachments
 Kirkham and Weeton
 Preesall (St Aidans Detachment)
 Thornton
 Fleetwood.
Merseyside ACF has detachments in Aintree, Birkenhead, Bootle, Crosby, Hightown, Hoylake, Huyton, Irby, Kirkby, Aigburth, Childwall, West Derby, Knotty Ash, Allerton, Speke, Norris Green, Moreton, Netherton, New Ferry, Newton-le-Willows, Oxton, Prescot, Southport, St Helens, Upton and Wallasey.

Yorkshire & Humberside
Humberside & South Yorkshire ACF has detachments in Adwick, Ashby, Balby, Barnsley, Barton-upon-Humber, Bentley, Beverley, Bridlington, Brigg, Brough, Cleethorpes, Cottingham, Darfield, Doncaster, Driffield, Goole, Grimsby, Hedon, Hornsea, Howden, Hull (Cadet Centre East Hull, Halifax Barracks, Hymers College, Londesborough Barracks ,Middleton Barracks, Sutton, Wenlock Barracks), Immingham, Kirton in Lindsey, Market Weighton, Mexborough, Pocklington, Rossington, Rotherham, Scunthorpe, Sheffield (Barnsley Road, Birdwell, Endcliffe, Gell Street, Greenhill, Mansfield Road), Thorne, Waltham, Willerby, Withernshaw and Wombwell and Wath upon Dearne.

Yorkshire (North and West) Army Cadet Force|Yorkshire North and West ACF has detachments in Allerton Bradford, at Thornton Old Road, Odsal, Shipley, Bingley, Bradford, Manningham Lane, Thornbury, Castleford, Catterick, Halifax, Harrogate, Huddersfield, Keighley, Knaresborough, Leeds (Bramley, Carlton Barracks, Harewood Barracks, Oakwood Lane, Seacroft, Yeadon), Spen Valley, Malton, Mirfield, Northallerton, Otley, Ripon, Scarborough, Selby, Skipton, Stokesley, Thirsk, Thongsbridge, Whitby, Woodlesford and York (Acomb, Duncombe Barracks, Fulford Road, Strensall Camp). Also E Company situated at Wakefield (HQ), Fitzwilliam, Batley, South Elmsall, Normanton, Pontefract and Ossett.

East Midlands
All Cadet Forces in the East Midlands Region report to the East Midlands Reserve Forces and Cadet Association.

Derbyshire ACF  has its County HQ in Sinfin:
 A Company has detachments in Bakewell, Buxton (A Coy Headquarters), Chapel-en-le-Frith, Glossop, Hathersage, Matlock, New Mills and Wirksworth.
 B Company has detachments in Alfreton, Bolsover, Chesterfield (B Coy Headquarters), Clay Cross, Creswell, Boythorpe, Eckington Staveley and Corps of Drums.
 C Company has detachments in Ashbourne, Belper, Codnor Park, Hallcroft, Heanor, Ilkeston (C Coy Headquarters), Long Eaton and Ripley.
 D Company has detachments in Draycott, Etwall, Kingsway, Melbourne, Mickleover, Phoenix street (D Coy Headquarters), Sinfin and Spondon.

Leicestershire, Northamptonshire and Rutland ACF has detachments in Ashby, Barrow upon Soar, Barton Seagrave, Brackley, Braunstone, Broughton Astley, Castle Donington, Coalville, Corby, Daventry, Desford, Hinckley, Ibstock, Kettering, Leicester (Blackbird Road, Brentwood Road, Evington, Gooding Avenue, Mowmacre Road, Ulvercroft Road), Loughborough, Market Bosworth, Market Harborough, Melton Mowbray, Mountsorrel, North Luffenham, Northampton (Barrack Road, Booth Lane, Briar Hill, Clare Street), Oadby, Oakham, Oundle, Peterborough, Rothwell, Rushden, Shepshed, Towcester, Wellingborough and Wigston.

Lincolnshire Army Cadet Force (Lincs ACF) has detachments in Abbey (Lincoln), Billingborough, Boston, Bourne, Caistor Yarborough School, Cherry Willingham, Coningsby, Crowland, Gainsborough, Grantham, Holbeach, Horncastle, Kirton, Newport (Lincoln), Sobraon (Lincoln), Band (North Hykeham), Long Sutton, Louth, Mablethorpe, Market Deeping, Market Rasen, Metheringham, North Somercotes, Navenby, North Hykeham, Phoenix School (Grantham), Priory City of Lincoln Academy, Skegness, Sleaford, Spalding, Stamford and Washingborough.

Lincs ACF is structured like most other Counties, it is broken down into 4 Companies, each of which contain several detachments. The different companies are named as follows:
 1 Coy (Number 1 Company) (Grenadier Guards, Royal Anglians, Royal Logistic Corps)
 2 Sqn (2 Squadron) (Queen's Royal Lancers The Parachute Regiment)
 3 Coy (Number 3 Company) (The Parachute Regiment, Royal Engineers, Royal Anglians)
 4 Coy (Number 4 Company) (Royal Army Medical Corps, Royal Engineers, Parachute Regiment, Royal Anglians)

Number 1 Company is the lead company in Lincs ACF, with Sobraon Barracks the headquarters of both 1 Coy and Lincs ACF. The Lincs ACF Headquarters, is a new build on the site of Sobraon Barracks. It was completed in March 2008, at a total cost of £1.33 million, this was paid for by East Midlands Reserve Forces and Cadets Association (EM RFCA) auctioning the old Barracks. This was done because the old barracks, situated in Newport in Lincoln, was falling into disrepair after the TA Detachment closed down in the 1990s leaving Lincs ACF the only occupants. Newport Barracks and its land was sold at £1.65 million and so the total project left EM RFCA with an extra £0.32 million. This saving was planned under its 'Spend to Save' scheme. The new headquarters of Lincs ACF in Sobraon Barracks was officially opened in June 2009 by HM Lord Lieutenant of Lincolnshire, Mr Tony Worth, with a celebratory open day and the building being blessed by the Padre of Lincs ACF.

Nottinghamshire Army Cadet Force has detachments in Arnold, Bakersfield, Beeston, Bilborough, Blidworth, Bulwell, Calverton, Carlton, Chilwell, Clifton, Clipstone, Eastwood, Harworth, Hucknall, Kirkby-in-Ashfield, Lenton, Mansfield, Newark, Ollerton, Retford, Ruddington, Sherwood, Southwell, Sutton-in-Ashfield, Tuxford, Warsop, West Bridgford, the nottingham academy (the newest detachment) and Worksop
These are broken down into 4 units: 
A Coy (Rifles)
B Coy (Mercians)
C Battery (SNH/1RHA Battery)
D Sqd (QRL and SRY)

West Midlands
Hereford and Worcester ACF
 A Company detachments in - Stourbridge, Droitwich, Bromsgrove, Halesowen, Redditch, Rubery
 B Company detachments in - Worcester, Kidderminster, Stourport, Evesham, Pershore, Malvern, St Johns
 C Company detachments in - Hereford, Ross-on-Wye, Bromyard, Kingstone, Leominster, Ledbury

Shropshire Army cadet force has detachments in:
 Bishops Castle
Bridgnorth
Broseley
Ellesmere
Ludlow
Market Drayton
Newport
Oswestry
Shifnal
Shrewsbury (Copthorne Barracks, Church Stretton, Pontesbury, Scott Street, Sundorne Road)
Telford (Dawley Bank, Madeley, Trench, Wellington)
Wem
Whitchurch.

Staffordshire and West Midlands (North Sector) ACF
 A Company (9 Detachments) Detachments are - Aldridge, Bloxwich, Brownhills, Oldbury, TP Riley, Walsall, Old Hill, West Bromwich and Willenhall.
 B Company (9 Detachments) Detachments are - Bilston, Brockmoor, Dudley, Perton, Scotts Green, West Park, Wolverhampton and Wombourne
 C Company (10 Detachments) Detachments are - Burton, Cannock, Hednesford, Lichfield, Rugeley, Stafford, Stafford - Corp Of Drums (Band Detachment), Stone, Tamworth, and Uttoxeter.
 D Company (9 Detachments) Detachments are - Bucknall, Cheadle, Corbridge, Cross Heath, Leek, Sanford Hill, Stockton Brook, Stoke and Tunstall.

Warwickshire and West Midlands South Sector ACF
A Company Glascote, Alum Rock, Northfield, (Tennal Grange) Harborne, Kingsbury, Sutton Coldfield, Kingstanding, Washward Heath, (Broadway School) Witton & Aston,
B Company Atherstone, Coventry (Holyhead Road, Westfield House and Canley), Wyken, Leamington Spa, Nuneaton, Rugby, Stratford-upon-Avon, Kineton and Warwick.
C Company *C Company Acocks Green (Alexander Road Platoon), Chelmsley Wood (Chelmsley Wood Platoon), Kings Heath (Brandwood House Platoon, Sheldon (Barrows Lane Platoon, Shirley (Haslucks Green Platoon, Small Heath (Stoney Lane Platoon)
Z Company - (restructured back to 4 companies without re-using D Company) Requires Update

East England
Essex ACF has detachments in Basildon, Billericay, Braintree, Brentwood, Brightlingsea, Canvey Island, Chelmsford, Clacton, Colchester, Dovercourt, Epping, Grays, Great Baddow, Great Dunmow, Harlow, Leigh on Sea, Maldon, Manningtree, Melbourne, Chipping Ongar, Parsons Heath, Rayleigh, Saffron Walden, Shoeburyness, South Woodham Ferrers, Southend on Sea, Southminster, Stanford Le Hope, Tilbury, Waltham Abbey, Warley and Witham.

Bedfordshire & Hertfordshire ACF is arranged into 5 companies each with 8 detachments:
1 Company has detachments in Bishops Stortford, Borehamwood, Cheshunt, Hatfield, Hertford, Hoddesdon, Waltham Cross and Ware.
2 Company has detachments in Buntingford, Harpenden, Hitchin, Letchworth, Royston, Stevenage (North), Stevenage (South) and Welwyn Garden City.
3 Company has detachments in Berkhamsted, Hemel Hempstead, Leavesden Green, Rickmansworth, South Oxhey, St Albans, Tring and Watford.
4 Company has detachments in Ampthill, Chicksands, Dunstable, Leagrave, Leighton Buzzard, Lidlington, Luton and Stanbridge.
5 Company has detachments in Bedford, Biggleswade, Cranfield, Kempston, Sandy, Sharnbrook, Stotfold and New Cardington (Shortstown).

Cambridgeshire ACF has four companies:
 1 (Hereward) Company has detachments in Cambridge, Chatteris, Fletton, March, Peterborough, Walton, Whittelsey, Wisbech and Yaxley.
 2 (Cromwell) Company has detachments in Cambourne, Chesterton, Cherry Hinton, Comberton, Huntingdon, Longstanton, Melbourn, Slepe (St Ives), St Ives, St Neots and Swavesey.
 3 (Ironside) Company has detachments in Bottisham, Burwell, Ely, Haddenham, Newmarket, Ramsey, Sawston, Soham and Waterbeach which currently holds the County Headquarters.
4 Company has detachments in Peterborough Regional College, Cambridge Regional College and the Cambridgeshire ACF Band.

Norfolk ACF has detachments in Acle, Attleborough, Aylsham, Costessey, Cromer, Dereham, Dersingham, Diss, Downham Market, Fakenham, Gorleston, Great Yarmouth, Harleston, Holt, Kings Lynn, Little Walsingham, Loddon, Long Stratton, North Walsham, Norwich, Swaffham, Thetford, Watton and Wymondham.

Norfolk ACF is split into three sub units
 Cadet Norfolk Artillery
 Cadet Norfolk Engineers
 Britannia Company
Each of these sub units have their own headquarters and control a portion of the counties administration, through their detachments.

Suffolk ACF has detachments in Beccles, Bungay, Bury St Edmunds, Felixstowe, Hadleigh, Halesworth, Haverhill, Ipswich, Ixworth, Kesgrave, Leiston, Lowestoft (North and South), Mildenhall, Stowmarket, Sudbury, Woodbridge and Wattisham.

South West England
The City and County of Bristol ACF is split into 3 companies (A, B and C coy) and has detachments in Bristol (Bishopsworth, Brislington, Clifton, Hanham, Horfield Common, Keynsham, Kingswood, Mangotsfield, Oldland Common, Patchway, Pilning, Purdown, Shirehampton, Speedwell, St George, Stockwood, Stoke Gifford, Winterstoke Road, Yate), Frampton Cottrell and Thornbury. Speedwell detachment shares its unit base with Whitfield Corps of Drums. Also, a fourth company( D coy) exists, although informally, and contains only one detachment which is officially counted as a unit within the CCF.

Cornwall Cadet Battalion (The Rifles) ACF comprises three companies:
 Gibraltar Company has detachments in Camborne, Falmouth, Hayle, Helston, Redruth, Penryn, Penzance, Isles of Scilly and Cornwall College.
 Inkerman Company has detachments in Bude, Liskeard, Looe, Lostwithiel, Launceston, Saltash and Torpoint.
 Lucknow Company has detachments in Bodmin, Newquay, St Austell, St Blazey, Truro and Wadebridge.

Devon ACF is broken down into 4 Companies with its headquarters in Exeter. Devon ACF's regimental affiliation is to the Rifles, an Infantry Regiment in the British Army which counts the Devonshire and Dorset Regiment amongst its antecedent regiments. The Detachments of Devon ACF are as follows:
 A (Aubers) Company (Exeter and East Devon) - Wyvern (Exeter), West Exe (Exeter), Cranbrook (Exeter), Exmouth, Crediton, Honiton, Cullompton, Tiverton, Sidmouth, Uffculme
 B (Bois des Buttes) Company (Plymouth) - Tavistock, Plymstock, Plympton, Mutley, Marine Academy Plymouth, All Saints Academy, Ivybridge, Crownhill.
 C (Cambrai) Company (North Devon) - South Molton, Okehampton, Holsworthy, Ilfracombe, Torrington, Braunton, Bideford, Barnstaple, Chulmleigh
 D (Delville Wood) Company (Torbay) - Bovey Tracey, Brixham, Newton Abbot, Paignton, Teignmouth, Ashburton, Torquay, Totnes
Devon ACF also maintains a Corps of Drums Detachment, whose cadets are normally drawn from across the county's existing Detachments.  The Corps of Drums enables cadets to attain qualifications within the Army Proficiency Certificate Music Syllabus.

Dorset ACF consists of one battalion sized unit containing 4 companies with its headquarters in Dorchester.
E (El Alamein) Company (The Rifles) has detachments in Bournemouth (Boscombe), Christchurch, Lytchett Matravers, Parkstone, Poole, Rossmore and Wallisdown.
N (Normandy) Company has detachments in Blandford (Rifles), Gillingham (Rifles), Shaftesbury (Rifles), Sherborne (Rifles), West Moors (RLC) and Wimborne (RTR)..
S (Salerno) company located on the Channel Islands has detachments on the islands of Guernsey (Rifles) and Jersey (Royal Jersey Militia), which has 2 detachments (Le Quesne Detachment and Grainville School Detachment).
W (Waterloo) Company Beaminster (Rifles), Bovington (RTR), Bridport (Rifles), Dorchester (Rifles), Lyme Regis (RWxY), Portland (Rifles) and Weymouth (Rifles).

Gloucestershire Cadet Battalion (The Rifles) ACF has detachments in Bishop's Cleeve, Bourton-on-the-Water, Brockworth, Cheltenham, Cinderford, Cirencester, Coleford, Dursley, Fairford, Gloucester (Eastern Avenue, Malmesbury Road, Milton Avenue), Innsworth, Moreton-in-Marsh, Newent, Stonehouse, Stroud, Tetbury, Tewkesbury and Wotton-under-Edge.

Somerset Cadet Battalion (The Rifles) ACF has detachments in:
Gibraltar Company - Burnham-on-Sea, Cheddar, Clevedon, Nailsea, Portishead, Weston-Super-Mare, Worle, Yatton
Jellalabad Company - Bridgwater, Cannington, Doniford, Minehead, Taunton, (Bishops Hull, Bishops Foxes and Priorswood), Wellington.
Normandy Company - Bath, Coleford, Frome, Glastonbury, Midsomer Norton, Paulton, Shepton Mallet, Wells.
Salamanca Company - Bruton (Sexeys School), Castle Cary, Chard, Crewkerne, Ilminster, Langport, Martock, and Yeovil.

Wiltshire ACF has 4 companies. Their affiliate regiments are the Rifles, the Royal Artillery, the Tank Regiment, the Royal Corps of Signals and the Wessex Yeomanry.

A (Ferozeshah): Abbey Park School, Swindon Academy, Dorcan Academy, Royal Wooton Basset, Church Place

B (Anzio): Abbeyfield, Calne, Colerne, Corsham Devizes, Marlborough

C (Arakan): Melksham, Trowbridge, Warminster, Westbury, Lavington, Tisbury

D (Gallipolli): Larkhill, Sarum Academy, Old Sarum, Downton, Bulford

South East England
Buckinghamshire (The Rifles) ACF consists of 4 Companies: A, E, I and G. Detachments are located in Aylesbury, Beaconsfield, Bletchley, Booker, Buckingham, Chesham, Great Missenden, High Wycombe, Land End, Marlow, Milton Keynes (Blakelands, Leon School, Conniburrow, Kents Hill) Princes Risborough, Winslow and Wolverton

Hampshire and Isle of Wight ACF Consist of 2 Battalions, each containing 3 Companies; 1st Hampshire and Isle of Wight ACF (A, B and C Companies) and 2nd Hampshire and Isle of Wight ACF (X, Y and Z Companies), and also a Band & Corps of Drums. It has detachments in Aldershot, Alton, Andover, Basingstoke Bembridge, Bishop's Waltham, Blackfield, Bordon Garrison, Brockenhurst, Browndown, Connaught, Cove, Cowplain, East Cowes, Eastleigh, FairOak, Fareham, Farnborough, Fleet, Fordingbridge, Freshwater, Gibraltar Barracks, Gosport, Hayling Island, Hythe, Itchen, Kings School, Winchester, Lee-on-Solent, Leigh Park, Liss, Lymington, Middle Wallop, Millbrook, New Milton, Newport, Old Basing, Overton, Park Gate, Portsmouth (Cosham, Hilsea, HM Naval Base), Romsey, Ryde, Sandown, Southampton (Burgoyne Road, Milbrook Road, Bittern Park School), St Helens, Totland, Totton, Ventnor, Winchester (Newburgh Street, Romsey Road, Worthy Down).

Kent ACF Is made up of 3 companies and a squadron. These are 'A' Company, 'B' Company, 'D' Company and Kent RE Squadron. Kent ACF has detachments in Ashford, Aylesham, Broadstairs, Burham, Canterbury, Cranbrook, Dartford, Deal, Ditton, Dover, Faversham, Folkestone, Gillingham, Gravesend, Hawkinge, Herne Bay, Maidstone, Margate, Paddock Wood, Rochester, Sandwich, Sevenoaks, Sheerness, Shorncliffe, Sittingbourne, Snodland, St Marys Bay, Strood, Swanley, Tenterden, Tonbridge, Tunbridge Wells, Walderslade, Westerham, Whitstable and Wrotham.

Oxfordshire (The Rifles) ACF  comprises four companies (Somme, Nivelle, Quebec and Calais) and has detachments in Abingdon, Bicester, Banbury, Burford, Carterton, Chipping Norton, Didcot, Eynsham, Faringdon, Henley, Blackbird Leys, Donnington Bridge Road, Elsfield Way, Kidlington, Marston Road, Oxpens Road, Thame, Wallingford, Wantage, Wheatley, Witney and Woodstock.

The Royal County of Berkshire ACF consists of 3 companies 

A Coy (Guards) 
 -18 Troop [Household Cavalry] Windsor
 -1 Platoon [Grenadier Guards] Windsor 
 -2 Platoon [Coldstream Guards] Chippenham 
 -3 Platoon [Scots Guards] Slough
 -4 Platoon [Irish Guards] Ascot
 -5 Platoon [Welsh Guards] Maidenhead 

B Coy (Rifles) 
 -13 Platoon [The Rifles] Burghfield 
 -14 Platoon [The Rifles] Newbury 
 -15 Platoon [The Rifles] Theale 
 -16 Platoon [The Rifles] Thatcham 
 -17 Platoon [The Rifles] Whitley 

C Coy (Corps of Royal Electrical and Mechanical Engineers) 
 -6 Platoon [Corps of Royal Electrical and Mechanical Engineers] Woodley
 -7 Platoon [Corps of Royal Electrical and Mechanical Engineers] Bracknell 
 -8 Platoon [Corps of Royal Electrical and Mechanical Engineers] Reading 
 -9 Platoon [Corps of Royal Electrical and Mechanical Engineers] Caversham 
 -10 Platoon [Corps of Royal Electrical and Mechanical Engineers] Wokingham 
 -11 Platoon [Corps of Royal Electrical and Mechanical Engineers] Arborfield 
 -Band Detachment [Royal Corps of Army Music] Reading 

Surrey ACF consists of 5 companies (A, B, C,D and E coy which has detachments in Addlestone, Banstead, Camberley, Caterham, Chertsey, Chobham, Cranleigh, Deepcut, Dorking, Farncombe, Farnham, Felbridge, Guildford, Haslemere, Horley, Leatherhead, Lingfield, Merrow, Mytchett, Pirbright, Redhill, Reigate, Walton-on-Thames and Woking.

Sussex ACF is split into 5 companies (A, B, C,D and E) and has detachments in Bexhill-on-Sea, Bognor Regis, Brighton - County HQ and E Company HQ, Burgess Hill, Chichester - B Company HQ, Crawley, Crowborough, Eastbourne - A Company HQ, Hailsham, Hastings Haywards Heath - C Company HQ, Heathfield, Horsham, St Bedes, Hove, Hurstpierpoint, Lewes, Littlehampton, Midhurst, Newhaven, Seaford, Shoreham-by-Sea - D Company HQ, Steyning, Thorney Island and Worthing.

London

City of London and North East Sector ACF with its HQ in Walthamstow is split into three companies:

2 Company covers the London Boroughs of City, Islington, Tower Hamlets & Hackney consisting of 6 detachments, those being:
 -21 Detachment [Intelligence Corps] Finsbury 
 -22 Detachment [Royal Regiment of Fusiliers] Hackney
 -23 Detachment [Corps of Royal Engineers] Holloway
 -24 Detachment [The Rifles] Mile End
 -25 Detachment [Princess of Wales Royal Regiment] Bethnal Green
 -26 Detachment [The Life Guards] Stoke Newington

3 Company covers the London Boroughs of Waltham Forest, Newham & Redbridge consisting of 6 detachments, those being:
 -31 Detachment [Inns of Court & City Yeomanry] Ilford
 -32 Detachment [Royal Anglian Regiment] Newbury Park
 -33 Detachment [Royal Anglian Regiment] Woodford Green
 -35 Detachment [Inns of Court & City Yeomanry] Walthamstow
 -36 Detachment [Royal Regiment of Fusiliers] Hainault
 -37 Detachment [Princess of Wales Royal Regiment] Chingford

4 Company covers the London Boroughs of Barking and Dagenham & Havering consisting of 8 detachments, those being:
 -41 Detachment [Royal Logistic Corps] Dagenham
 -42 Detachment [Scots Guards] Romford
 -43 Detachment [Royal Horse Artillery] East Ham
 -44 Detachment [Royal Horse Artillery] Barking
 -45 Detachment [Royal Regiment of Fusiliers] Romford
 -46 Detachment [The Rifles] West Ham
 -47 Detachment [Royal Anglian Regiment] South Hornchurch
 -48 Detachment [Royal Logistic Corps] Upminster

Greater London South East Sector ACF with its HQ in Blackheath is split into three companies:

7 (London Yeomanry) Company covers the London Boroughs of Southwark and Lambeth consisting of 6 detachments, those being: 
 -71 Detachment [Irish Guards] Camberwell
 -72 Detachment [Princess of Wales Royal Regiment] Rotherhithe
 -74 Detachment [Royal Regiment of Fusiliers] Upper Tulse Hill 
 -75 Detachment [Royal Army Medical Corps] Kennington
 -77 Detachment [The Rifles] Brixton
 -78 Detachment [Grenadier Guards] Highwood Barracks

9 (London Artillery) Company covers the London Boroughs of Lewisham and Greenwich consisting of 7 detachments, those being: 
 -92 Detachment [Royal Regiment of Fusiliers] Catford 
 -94 Detachment [Royal Regiment of Fusiliers] Blackheath
 -95 Detachment [Scots Guards] Eltham 
 -96 Detachment [Royal Regiment of Artillery] Lewisham
 -97 Detachment [Royal Horse Artillery] Woolwich Barracks
 -98 Detachment [The Rifles] Erith
 -99 Detachment [Irish Guards] Catford

10 (Kent) Company covers the London Boroughs of Bexley and Bromley consisting of 8 detachments, those being:
 -101 Detachment [Princess of Wales Royal Regiment] Penge
 -102 Detachment [Scots Guards] Lewisham
 -103 Detachment [Royal Regiment of Fusiliers] Orpington
 -104 Detachment [Irish Guards] Bromley
 -106 Detachment [Royal Military Police] Sidcup
 -107 Detachment [Royal Corps of Signals] Bexleyheath 
 -108 Detachment [Corps of Royal Engineers] Erith 
 -109 Detachment [Royal Regiment of Artillery] Belvedere

Greater London South West Sector ACF with its HQ in St John's Hill is split into three companies:

13 Company covers the London Boroughs of Wandsworth, Merton & Lambeth consisting of 7 detachments, those being:
 -131 Detachment [Royal Tank Regiment] Battersea
 -132 Detachment [Grenadier Guards] Southfields
 -133 Detachment [Royal Military Police] Wandsworth
 -134 Detachment [Royal Regiment of Fusiliers] Merton
 -135 Detachment [Royal Regiment of Fusiliers] Balham
 -136 Detachment [Princess of Wales Royal Regiment] Wimbledon
 -137 Detachment [Grenadier Guards] Putney

14 Company covers the London Borough of Croydon consisting of 6 detachments, those being:
 -143 Detachment [Princess of Wales Royal Regiment] Shirley
 -144 Detachment [Blues & Royals] Croydon 
 -145 Detachment [Scots Guards] New Addington
 -146 Detachment [Royal Logistic Corps] Croydon
 -148 Detachment [Royal Corps of Signals] Coulsdon
 -149 Detachment [The Rifles] Upper Norwood

15 Company covers the London Boroughs of Kingston-upon-Thames & Richmond-upon-Thames consisting of 6 detachments, those being:
 -151 Detachment [Princess of Wales Royal Regiment] Kingston-upon-Thames
 -152 Detachment [Royal Regiment of Fusiliers] Cobham
 -154 Detachment [The Parachute Regiment] Epsom
 -155 Detachment [Princess of Wales Royal Regiment] Ewell
 -156 Detachment [Royal Regiment of Fusiliers] Kingston-upon-Thames
 -157 Detachment [Royal Regiment of Artillery] Sutton

Middlesex and North West London Sector ACF with its HQ on South Africa Road is split into four companies:

19 Company covers the London Boroughs of Hillingdon & Hounslow consisting of 7 detachments, those being:
 -191 Detachment [Royal Corps of Signals] Uxbridge
 -192 Detachment [Army Air Corps] Heston
 -193 Detachment [Royal Logistic Corps] Southall
 -194 Detachment [Princess of Wales Royal Regiment] Hounslow
 -195 Detachment [Princess of Wales Royal Regiment] Staines
 -196 Detachment [Corps of Royal Engineers] Twickenham
 -197 Detachment [Royal Regiment of Fusiliers] Feltham

20 Company covers the London Boroughs of Ealing, Harrow, Brent & Hammersmith and Fulham consisting of 6 detachments, those being:
 -201 Detachment [Royal Army Medical Corps] Harrow
 -202 Detachment [Corps of Royal Engineers] Acton
 -203 Detachment [Royal Logistic Corps] Ealing
 -204 Detachment [The Parachute Regiment] White City
 -205 Detachment [The Parachute Regiment] Wembley
 -207 Detachment [Royal Corps of Signals] Hammersmith
 -208 Detachment [Royal Regiment of Fusiliers] Willesden

21 Company covers the London Boroughs of Barnet, Enfield & Haringey consisting of 6 detachments, those being:
 -211 Detachment [Princess of Wales Royal Regiment] Edgware 
 -212 Detachment [Royal Regiment of Fusiliers] Hornsey
 -214 Detachment [The Parachute Regiment] Finchley
 -215 Detachment [Corps of Royal Engineers] Kingsbury
 -216 Detachment [Blues & Royals] Tottenham
 -218 Detachment [Royal Logistic Corps] Barnet

23 Company covers the London Boroughs of Kensington and Chelsea, City of Westminster & Camden consisting of 8 detachments, those being:
 -231 Detachment [The Rifles] Paddington
 -232 Detachment [The Rifles] Maida Vale
 -233 Detachment [The Rifles] Russel Square
 -234 Detachment [The Rifles] Victoria
 -235 Detachment [Scots Guards] Victoria 
 -236 Detachment [The Life Guards] Kensington
 -238 Detachment [Royal Logistic Corps] Regent's Park
 -239 Detachment [Royal Yeomanry] Fulham

Scotland

1st Battalion The Highlanders ACF
With detachments in

Inverness Company - Aviemore, Fort Augustus, Fort William, Fortrose, Raigmore and Inverness

Moray Company - Culloden, Ardersier (temporarily disbanded), Nairn, Forres, Elgin and Pipes & Drums, Culloden

Ross Company - Alness, Dingwall, Dornoch, Kyle, Ardgay, Portree, Dunvegan and Tain

Caithness Company - Brora, Castletown, Thurso and Wick, Halkirk and BettyHill

Western Isles Company - Benbecula, Harris, Daliburgh, Stornaway, Back, Ness

2nd Battalion The Highlanders ACF
With detachments in
 A Coy (Vittoria) - Parachute Regiment, RAMC, Scots Dragoon Guards, RE, RRS Bridge of Don, RRS Woodside, RRS Stonehaven, RRS Banchory, RRS Aboyne
 B Coy (Somme) - RRS Ellon, RRS Fraserburgh, RRS Inverurie, RRS Peterhead, Signals Mintlaw
 C Coy (Corruna) - RRS Banff, RRS Keith, RRS Huntly, RRS Buckie, RRS Portsoy, RRS Turriff,

Angus and Dundee Battalion ACF

Arras Company - Kirriemuir Black Watch, Forfar Black Watch, Arbroath Black Watch, Brechin Black Watch and Montrose Royal Artillery.

Cambria Company - Arbroath Royal Artillery, Panmure Black Watch, Carnoustie Black Watch, Monifieth Black Watch and Grove Black Watch.

Salamanca Company - Stobswell Black Watch, Royal Signals, RAMC, Para Detachment and Dundee Royal Artillery.

Waterloo Company - Dundee DGs, Newport DGs, Royal Engineers, St Mary's Black Watch and Kirkton Black Watch.

Argyll and Sutherland Highlanders Battalion ACF

Divided into five companies (affiliated to the Argyll & Sutherland Highlanders) and one squadron (affiliated to the Royal Tank Regiment).
 A Company (Stirling) has detachments in Bannockburn, Callander, Dunblane and Stirling.
 B Company (Falkirk) has detachments in Bo'ness, Camelon, Denny, Falkirk, Grangemouth and Larbert.
 C Company (Clackmannan) has detachments in Alloa, Alva, Tullibody and Tillicoultry.
 D Company (Argyll) has detachments in Campbeltown, Dunoon, Islay, Lochgilphead, Tarbert, Mull and Oban.
 E Company (Dumbarton West) has detachments in Arrochar, Clydebank, Dumbarton, Garelochhead, Helensburgh, Milngavie and Vale of Leven.
 F Squadron (Dumbarton East) has detachments in Bishopbriggs, Condorrat, Cumbernauld, Kilsyth and Kirkintilloch.

Black Watch Battalion ACF
With detachments in Auchterarder, Balligry, Blairgowrie, Cowdenbeath, Crieff, Dunfermline, Dunkeld, Perth, Cupar, Glenrothes, Kinross, Kirkcaldy, Leven, Newburgh, Rosyth, St Andrews and Stanley.

The Orkney Independent Cadet Battery ACF has its detachment in Kirkwall.

The Shetland Independent Cadet Battery ACF has its detachment in Lerwick.

Glasgow and Lanarkshire Battalion ACF
The battalion is divided into three companies (which are affiliated with; Scots Guards, Royal Scots Borderers, Royal Highland Fusiliers, Royal Artillery, Royal Scots Dragoon Guards, Royal Engineers, & Royal Signals

 Amiens
 1 Platoon Royal Scots Borderers Strathaven
 2 Platoon Royal Scots Borderers Motherwell
 3 Platoon Royal Scots Borderers Newmains
 3 Troop Royal Engineers Airdrie
 4 Platoon Scots Guards Bellshill
 5 Platoon Scots Guards Lanark
 5 Platoon Royal Scots Borderers Coalburn
 6 Platoon Royal Scots Borderers Larkhall
 Normandy
 A Troop Royal Artillery Broomhill
 B Troop Royal Artillery Drumchapel
 C Troop Royal Artillery Anderston
 C Platoon Royal Highland Fusiliers Easterhouse
 D Troop Royal Artillery Carmyle
 E Platoon Royal Highland Fusiliers Shettleston
 Royal Signals Maryhill
 F Platoon Royal Highland Fusiliers Glasgow Highlanders (Maryhill)
 Invictus
 A Platoon Royal Highland Fusiliers King's Park
 B Platoon Royal Highland Fusiliers Cambuslang
 Pipes And Drums Detachment Cambuslang
 1 Platoon Royal Electrical & Mechanical Engineers East Kilbride
 2 Platoon Royal Electrical & Mechanical Engineers East Kilbride
 4 Platoon Royal Scots Borderers Hamilton
 D Platoon Royal Highland Fusiliers Pollokshaws
 6 Troop Scots Dragoon Guards Govan
 HQ
 Pipes & Drums Cambuslang
 Glasgow and Lanarkshire Battalion's HQ is at Dechmont in Cambuslang

Lothian and Borders Battalion ACF
Lothian and Borders Battalion, Army Cadet Force has over 550 cadets and 150 adult volunteers in 35 detachments spread right across the capital city of Edinburgh and the Lothian and the Borders areas of Scotland. Most detachments in the battalion parade between 1900 and 2100 hours once each week. Each company is named after a unique Battle Honours.

The battalion is split into four companies as follows:

Alma Company: Midlothian
 10 Platoon - Bonnyrigg
 11 Platoon - Penicuik
 12 Platoon - Dalkeith
 19 Troop - Gilmerton
 20 Platoon - Colinton Road
 21 Troop - Chesser Crescent
 22 Troop - Lanark Road
 35 Troop - Alnwickhill
 36 Platoon - Loanhead

Somme Company: West Lothian
 25 Troop - Linlithgow
 26 Platoon - Livingston
 27 Platoon - Bathgate
 28 Platoon - Broxburn
 29 Platoon - Whitburn
 Uniformed Services - Broxburn Academy
 Pipes and Drums - Based in Colinton
 Regimental Band - Based in Chesser

Minden Company: The Scottish Borders
 1 Platoon - Eyemouth
 2 Platoon - Duns
 4 Platoon - Kelso
 5 Platoon - Jedburgh
 6 Platoon - Hawick
 8 Platoon - Galashiels
 9 Platoon - Selkirk
 15 Platoon - Peebles

Kohima Company: North East Edinburgh and East Lothian
 14 Troop - Musselburgh
 16 Platoon - Dunbar
 17 Platoon - Granton
 18 Platoon - East Claremont Street
 23 Troop - McDonald Road
 24 Platoon - South Queensferry
 31 Platoon - Tranent
 32 Platoon - Prestonpans
 34 Platoon - North Berwick
 33 Troop - Haddington

Drumshoreland Weekend Training Centre is the headquarters for Lothian & Borders Army Cadet Force. Situated just south of Broxburn in West Lothian, Drumshoreland houses the permanent staff from the battalion everyday where they work to ensure the smooth running of the battalion's day-to-day operations. As well as this, Drumshoreland is the location at which many weekend training camps take place including courses and training which take longer from the 3* JCIC & Outreach Programmes Lothian & Borders ACF conducts to other courses conducted on a National or Regional level for the ACFA. Such as The Duke Of Edinburgh's Award and The Prince's Trust. Drumshoreland is also used periodically to house various guests including the Regular & Territorial Army plus visitors from overseas such as The Royal Canadian Army Cadets.

The West Lowland Battalion ACF
West Lowland Battalion has over 600 cadets and 120 adult volunteers in 33 detachments spread right across the South West of Scotland.  The detachments cover eight council areas including two islands, Rothesay on the Isle of Bute and the Isle of Arran. Most detachments parade between 1900 and 2130 hours on one evening each week. The headquarters is located at the CTC in Ayr.

The Battalion is split into four companies as follows.

Balaklava Company -
 Arran RHF,
 Erskine A&SH,
 Garnock Valley RSDG,
 Gourock A&SH,
 Port Glasgow A&SH,
 Renfrew A&SH,
 Rothesay A&SH,
 Saltcoats RSDG.

Inkerman Company -
 Auchinleck RHF,
 Ayr RHF,
 Belmont,
 Dalmellington RHF,
 Girvan SNIY,
 Kilmarnock RA,
 Kilmarnock RHF,
 Maybole SNIY,
 Tarbolton RHF.

Kohima Trg Gp -
 Barrhead RSIGS,
 Giffnock RE,
 Johnstone RE,
 Irvine RLC,
 Paisley RA,
 Paisley RE,
 Troon PARA.

Minden Company -
 Annan KOSB,
 Castle Douglas KOSB,
 Dalbeattie KOSB,
 Dumfries KOSB,
 Kirkconnel KOSB,
 Kirkcudbright KOSB,
 Lockerbie KOSB,
 Newton Stewart KOSB,
 Stranraer KOSB.

Wales

Clwyd & Gwynedd ACF
Amalgamated as a region in April 2009, there are now five cadet companies with the majority of detachments being affiliated to The Royal Welsh although some detachments have a historical link with The Royal Artillery and the Royal Electrical and Mechanical Engineers, more recently a number of detachments have affiliated with The Welsh Guards, The 1st The Queen's Dragoon Guards and The Royal Logistic Corps.  Tywyn detachment came back to their old roots by rejoining Clwyd & Gwynedd ACF from Gwent & Powys ACF upon amalgamation in 2009.

The Cadet Commandant is Colonel M L Craven with Deputy Commandants Lt Col G M Jones (CFAVs) and Lt Col R L Borland TD VR (Cadets), the Cadet Executive Officer is Major B Pagent, the County Training Officer is Major W LeCras. The Corp of Drums are also badged Royal Welsh, wearing their scarlets for their parades.

 Albuhera Company ' ' 'Commanded by Major D M Jones and covers the following Detachments:-
Mold (QDG), Buckley (QDG), Llangollen (R WELSH), Wrexham (R WELSH), Rossett (R WELSH), Bradley (WG), Brynteg (WG), Rhosllannerchrugog (R WELSH).
 Somme Company ' ' 'Commanded by Major D Elie and covers the following Detachments:-
Deeside (RLC), Holywell (WG), Flint (R WELSH), Kinmel (RAMC), Prestatyn (REME), Denbigh (R WELSH), Colwyn Bay (R WELSH), Rhyl (R WELSH)
 Burma Company ' ' ' Commanded by Major T Cooper and covers the following Detachments:-
Amlwch (R WELSH), Holyhead (R WELSH), Llangefni (R WELSH), Menai Bridge (R WELSH), Bangor (RA), Bethesda (R WELSH), Penmaenmawr (R WELSH), Conwy (R WELSH), Llandudno (RA).
 Minden Company ' ' 'Commanded by Major W Thomas and covers the following Detachments:-
Caernarfon (R WELSH), Llanberis (R WELSH), Penygroes (R WELSH), Pwllheli (R WELSH), Porthmadog (QDG), Barmouth (R WELSH), Blaunau FFestiniog (R WELSH), Dolgellau (R WELSH), Tywyn (R WELSH).
 Crecy Company ' ' 'Commanded by Capt C Lloyd Senior Cadet Training Company

Dyfed & Glamorgan ACF

Amalgamated as a region in April 2009, when Dyfed amalgamated with Glamorgan at a ceremony held at the new HQ in Bridgend. The main cap badge is that of the Royal Welsh worn by 5 Companies, although there is 1 detachment that wear the Royal Monmouthshire Royal Engineers Cap badge, there are also another 2 Companies who wear mainly Welsh Guards and Queens Dragoon Guards cap badges respectively.

The County HQ - Bridgend TA Centre.

Commandant - Colonel T Hayter.

CEO - LtCol (Retd) K Smith

A Company (Cardiff) - Commanded by Capt K Kitching
 Barry
 Cathays
 Ely
 Fairwater
 Gabalfa
 Llandaff North (Cap badged Royal Army Medical Corps)
 Penarth
 Rhoose
 Ty Llewellyn (Cap badged Royal Corps of Signals)

B (Rorkes Drift) Company (Swansea & Neath Port Talbot) - Commanded by Capt K James (Acting OC)
 Clydach (Cap badged R Welsh)
 Glamorgan Street (Cap badged Royal Monmouthshire Royal Engineers)
 Gorseinon (Cap badged R Welsh)
 Morfa (Cap badged R Welsh)
 Morriston (Cap badged R Welsh)
 Neath (Cap badged R Welsh)
 Port Talbot (Cap badged R Welsh)
 The Grange (Cap baged RLC)
 Townhill (Mothballed)

C Company (Bridgend) - Commanded by Capt G Watson
 Beddau (Mothballed)
 Bridgend (Cap badged REME)
 Maesteg (Cap badged Royal Welsh)
 Pontypridd (Cap badged Royal Welsh)
 Porthcawl (Cap badged Royal Welsh)
 Talbot Green (Cap badged Royal Welsh)
 Tonyrefail (Mothballed)

D Company (Merthyr, Aberdare & Rhondda) - Commanded by Major L Martin
 Cwmbach
 Dowlais
 Ferndale
 Hirwaun
 Merthyr
 Mountain Ash
 Pentre
 Treharris

E Squadron, QDG's (Pembrokeshire) - Commanded by Major J Protheroe
 Fishguard
 Haverfordwest
 Milford Haven
 Narberth
 Neyland
 Pembroke Dock
 St Clears
 Tenby
 Burry Port (Cap badged Royal Welsh)
 Llanelli (Cap badged Royal Welsh)
 Trimsaran (Cap badged Royal Welsh)

F Company.
 Llanelli - Corps of Drums

G Company, Welsh Guards (Ceredigion and Carmarthenshire) - Commanded by Major A Richards
 Aberystwyth (Cap badged Welsh Guards)
 Cardigan
 Lampeter
 Newcastle Emlyn
 Ammanford (Cap badged Royal Welsh)
 Carmarthen (Cap badged Royal Logistic Corps)
 Cross Hands (Cap badged Royal Welsh)

Gwent and Powys ACF

County HQ: Cwrt Y Gollen
Commandant - Col D Chipp
Deputy Commandant North - Lt Col M Berriman

Deputy Commandant South - Lt Col W Morris

Safety Officer -
CEO - Maj Munroe

Formerly Gwent ACF : Lt Col I R Gumm
C Company (formerly Arras Coy) - Newport and surrounding areas. (Mixture of Cap badges, R Welsh, R Mon RE, RA)
 Caerphilly
 Crosskeys
 Cwmbran
 Griffithstown
 Malpas
 Pontypool
D Company (formerly Salamanca Coy)
Aberbargoed
Abertillery
Blackwood
Brynmawr
Cascade
Ebbw Vale
Tredegar
F Company (formerly Mons Coy) - East Monmouthshire Area (mixture of Cap badges, R Mon RE (Monmouth), R Welsh, Rifles (Chepstow), QDG (Caldicot))
 Abergavenny
 Blaenavon
 Caldicot
 Chepstow
 Gilwern
 Monmouth

Formerly Powys ACF : Lt Col D Saunders
A Battery - Radnorshire Area (Royal Artillery)
Zulu Company (B&C Companies amalgamated to form Zulu Company - Montgomeryshire Area & Brecnockshire Area)

The Band of G&P ACF - Gwent and Powys ACF band is badged to the Welsh Guards.

Northern Ireland
Both Battalions Headquartered in Carryduff, Co. Down.

1st (N.I.) Battalion, Army Cadet Force
Consisting of 4 Companies - A, B, C, D covering the North and West of Northern Ireland, including some areas of North Belfast. Training centre is the new North West Training Centre, Magilligan. Cap badges include: Royal Irish Regiment, Royal Artillery, Royal Army Medical Corps, Army Air Corps, Irish Guards, Royal Signals, Royal Logistic Corps, Royal Dragoon Guards and Royal Engineers.

A COMPANY 
A Company is located in County Tyrone and County Fermanagh, with their Headquarters in St Lucia Cadet Centre Omagh.A Coy covers Co. Fermanagh and Tyrone (Entirely cap badged to Royal Irish Regiment with exception of Enniskillen Royal Grammar School detachment and Omagh Open detachment) 

With 7 Detachments 

Omagh

Enniskillen

Enniskillen Royal Grammar School

Fivemiletown

Dungannon

Magherafelt

Cookstown

Omagh Schools (*Closed until further notice)

B COMPANY 
B Company is located in the City and County Londonderry, with their Headquarters in Caw Army Reserve Centre Londonderry

With 8 Detachments 

Caw

Lisneal College

Newbuildings

Drumahoe

Limavady

Coleraine College

Coleraine

Ballymoney

C COMPANY 
C Company is located in County Antrim with their Headquarters in Ballymena Army Reserve Centre,

With 8 Detachments Currently

Ballymena

Cullybackey

Antrim

Band, Drums and Pipes (Antrim)

Larne

Glengormley

Cambridge House Grammar School

Ballyclare

JHC Aldergrove detachment (opening 2023)

D COMPANY 
D Company is located in County Antrim and North Belfast area, with their Headquarters in Abbotscroft Army Reserve Centre,

With 8 Detachments 

Whitehouse

Monkstown

Carrickfergus Grammar School

Carrickfergus

Greenisland

Whitehead

Model Schools

Dunmore

Carnmoney (*Closed until further notice)

For some administration The two Battalions come under 38 Irish Brigade based in Thiepval Barracks in Lisburn. The Battalion "flash" worn on a MTP blanking plate consists of a red, hand on a green shamrock with the text "1st NI Bn"

.

2nd (N.I.) Battalion, Army Cadet Force
Consisting of 4 Companies - E, F, G and H 
E Coy - Covers most of lower Down and Armagh, They all badged Royal Irish Regiment
F Coy - Covers outskirts of Belfast and other part of Co. Down 
G Coy - Covers most of North Down and Ards Pensulia 
H Coy - Covers the rest of Belfast and Lisburn 
2nd Bn trains at the Caledon Cadet Training Centre, Ballykinler. Cap badges include : Royal Irish Regiment (All of E Coy are badged RIR), Royal Artillery, Queens Royal Hussars (Only detachment in Northern Ireland to wear this is in G Coy), Royal Logistic Corps, Royal Engineers, Irish Guards, Royal Corps of Signals, Adjutant General's Corps and The Rifles (Only detachment in Northern Ireland to wear this is in H Coy).

The Battalion "flash" on MTP blanking plate consists of a green shamrock with the symbol "2" on a kakhi and red split square.

38 Cadet Training Team Hollywood offer training to both Battalions and also organise both Battalions SCIC and New Cadet Adult Volunteers AIC Training at their annual camps.

References

External links
 Gwent and Powys ACF
 Army Cadet Force Interactive map
 Unofficial ACf Forum
 https://armycadets.com/county/1st-northern-ireland-battalion-acf/

British Army training
Youth organisations based in the United Kingdom
Army cadet organisations
British Cadet organisations
Cadet force

no:Heimevernsungdommen
nn:Heimevernsungdom
sv:Hemvärnsungdom